Behjaan (also Romanized as Behjaan) is a village in Posht Par Rural District, Simakan District, Jahrom County, Fars Province, Iran. At the 2006 census, its population was 1,641, in 405 families.

References 

Populated places in Jahrom County